Zielonka  is a village in the administrative district of Gmina Szczytno, within Szczytno County, Warmian-Masurian Voivodeship, in northern Poland. There are four alternative names called Seelonken, Ulrichssee, Zielonka, and Zielonken. It is populated place where people live and work.

 

References

Zielonka